Ford Saarlouis Body & Assembly (SB&A) is a major car plant located on the western edge of Saarlouis in the German Saarland. It belongs to Ford-Werke GmbH, the German subsidiary of the American automaker Ford Motor Company.

History
The construction of the plant started in 1966 on a former airfield. On 16 September 1966, the foundation stone was laid. In 1968, the production of car body panels for Renault started.

The plant commenced car production on 16 January 1970, and was formally opened in the presence of Henry Ford II six months later in June 1970. It was designed to co-produce with Ford’s Halewood plant the company’s recently introduced Escort model, itself intended to compete head-on with Opel’s successful Kadett in the various markets of continental Europe.

At the time the plant was opened, the UK, where the Escort had been produced since the end of 1967, was not part of the European Economic Community and it was not clear whether or when it would join.

In June 2019, Ford announced it would reduce the number of shifts at Saarlouis in an effort to cut costs, as part of a Europe-wide restructuring plan that includes closing several assembly plants in the continent.

In June 2022, Ford announced it will produce its future electric models at Ford Valencia Body and Assembly, leaving the future of the Saarlouis plant past 2025 uncertain.

Current output

Former output

The plant produced its 5,000,000th vehicle in 1990 and the 10,000,000th on 1 July 2005.

Gallery

Employment
Employee numbers reflecting both the changing fortunes of the small family cars produced there and the increasing automation of car production in Europe have evolved as follows:

In 2005 the plant employed 6,800 workers, organised into three teams. There were also significant numbers from Italy and Turkey. 7% of the workforce were female.

Sources and further reading
This entry incorporates information from the equivalent entry in the French Wikipedia

https://uk.motor1.com/news/296339/ford-c-max-cancelled-europe/

References

External links
 Ford Saarlouis from overhead by WikiMaps.
 Ford Saarlouis from overhead by Google Maps.
  The plant's history on the Saarlouis municipal website (in German).
   Ford Germany website (in German).
   Website of the plant trades union, IG Metall at Ford Sarrelouis (in German).
  Website dedicated to the rail-locomotives at Ford Sarrelouis (in German).

Ford of Europe factories
Ford Saarlouis body and assembly plant
Buildings and structures in Saarlouis (district)
Economy of Saarland